Szabina Mayer (née Reiner; born 24 March 1988) is a Hungarian handballer for Békéscsaba.

Achievements
Nemzeti Bajnokság I:
Winner: 2006, 2009, 2010, 2011
Magyar Kupa:
Winner: 2006, 2009, 2010, 2011
EHF Champions League:
Finalist: 2009
Semifinalist: 2010, 2011

References

External links

Career statistics at Worldhandball

1988 births
Living people
People from Pápa
Hungarian female handball players
Győri Audi ETO KC players
Fehérvár KC players
Hungarian people of Austrian descent
Sportspeople from Veszprém County